Parroquia Nuestra Señora de la Piedad of Temperley is a Catholic church located in the city of 
Temperley, south part of Greater Buenos Aires, Argentina.

History 

The Parroquia Nuestra Señora de la Piedad was established on June 26, 1931, by initiative of the monsignor Francisco Alberti, being its first priest Félix Dutari Rodríguez. The parish is located in the "barrio inglés" of Temperley, a neighborhood of typical English architecture, who was populated towards the end of the 19th century by settlers of British origin, and also by Irish Catholics, whose descendants were faithful of the parish.

References 

20th-century Roman Catholic church buildings in Argentina
Roman Catholic churches completed in 1930
Christianity in Buenos Aires